Pizzuti is an Italian surname. Notable people with the surname include:

Juan Flere Pizzuti (born 1998), Argentine footballer
Juan José Pizzuti (1927–2020), Argentine footballer and manager
Simone Pizzuti (born 1990), Italian footballer

Italian-language surnames